Duly Health and Care Field, formerly known as Silver Cross Field and Joliet Route 66 Stadium, is a baseball field located in Joliet, Illinois. The stadium was built in 2002 and holds 6,016 people. It is the home of the Joliet Slammers.

In December 2010, the Joliet Jackhammers were sold to Steel City Baseball LLC. As a result of the details of the sale, mainly pertaining to the non-payment of outstanding debts, the Joliet Jackhammers ceased operations. Steel City Baseball LLC renamed and rebranded the franchise as the Joliet Slammers, in theme of the old Joliet prison as well as a grand slam in the sport of baseball.

Stadium

Duly Health and Care Field has two levels; the main level and a second level of suites. The main seating area runs from first to third base and there are about 20 rows. There is a general admission lawn area. There are no outfield seats, but there is a large picnic pavilion area beyond the left field wall. There is a concourse that goes completely around the field, but the concourse in right field is behind the fence and one cannot see the field from this area. This was one of the main adjustments made in the facility's US$1.6 million 2018 improvement plan, along with mostly repairs to stadium infrastructure. Since the 2018 renovations, there has only been one soccer tournament held and no lacrosse matches to date. Joliet Slammers Vice President of Marketing and Sales John Wilson has stated that the reason for lack of expanded sporting use is the high demand for baseball to be played on the field.

The ballpark's former name was Silver Cross Field, with the naming rights belonging to Silver Cross Hospital. In November 2017, the City of Joliet announced their plan for rename the facility Joliet Route 66 Stadium, which included a new facade showcasing the area's automotive history centered around U.S. Route 66. In May 2022, the ballpark was renamed to Duly Health and Care Field, reflecting name change of DuPage Medical Group to Duly Health and Care in September of 2021.

Ownership
The city of Joliet owns the land and stadium. The city splits the naming rights revenue with the Joliet Slammers.

Events

Duly Health and Care Field also plays host to the University of St. Francis baseball team as well as local high school baseball games and competitions. It is the site of the annual 3A and 4A IHSA State Final Baseball Tournament that happens every summer. The Joliet Slammers, being the primary tenant, rent out the field to any teams that would like to play in a professional stadium. The facility also hosts several youth baseball leagues in the area as well certain special events, such as the annual Joliet Police Department vs. Joliet Fire Department rivalry nicknamed "Guns and Hoses".

The facility was slated to play host to a rock concert named the Joliet Slammers Fest on August 10, 2019, but plans fell through when concerns about damaging the newly-installed artificial turf arose. Bands such as Everclear, Bowling for Soup, and Alien Ant Farm, among others, were slated to perform at what was supposed to be the first concert ever held at the stadium. Joliet Slammers management has remained verbally open to the possibility of hosting concert events in the future if proper safety measures can be taken to protect the turf surface. The facility also hosted a wedding in the summer of 2019. Joliet Slammers Director of Tournaments and Special Events Cori Herbert said he estimates that about 425 events were held at DuPage Medical Group Field in 2019 alone.

References

External links
Joliet Slammers website

Sports venues in Joliet, Illinois
Minor league baseball venues
Baseball venues in Illinois
2002 establishments in Illinois
Sports venues completed in 2002
Frontier League ballparks
Soccer venues in Illinois